Albrecht Feez (1825 – 25 July 1905) was a politician in Queensland, Australia. He was a Member of the Queensland Legislative Assembly. He died on 25 July 1905 in Munich Germany.

Family life 
He married Sophia Milford on 13 October 1857 in Brisbane and they had two sons.

Career 
Feez served in the Army in Germany and gained pastoral experience. He was a storekeeper in 1858 and a Carrier in Rockhampton. He was also a merchant, a Rockhampton Alderman and mayor in 1879.

References

1825 births
1905 deaths
Members of the Queensland Legislative Assembly
19th-century Australian politicians